is a Japanese four-panel yuri comedy manga series written and illustrated by Nanatsu Mukunoki. The series began publication in Ichijinsha's Comic Yuri Hime magazine in November 2016. An anime television series adaptation by Doga Kobo aired in Japan between January and March 2019. A theatrical anime film titled Wataten!: An Angel Flew Down to Me: Precious Friends premiered in October 2022.

Plot
Miyako Hoshino is a very shy college student. When her younger sister Hinata Hoshino brings home her classmate, Hana Shirosaki, Miyako becomes enchanted by her cuteness and begins having her dress up in cosplay in exchange for snacks. The series follows Miyako as she grows closer to Hana, along with Hinata's other friends, Noa Himesaka, Koyori Tanemura, and Kanon Konomori.

Characters

A college student who is very shy around strangers and spends most of her time indoors. She becomes smitten by Hana and starts making her snacks in exchange for getting her to dress up in the cosplay outfits she makes. She pursuits a career as a fashion designer.

An elementary school student who is classmates with Hinata. She is often disturbed by Miyako's behavior but puts up with it to eat her sweets.

Miyako's younger sister and Hana's classmate. She is particularly fond of her sister, who she nicknames , and has a considerable sister complex.

Hana and Hinata's classmate who moves next door to Miyako and Hinata. She constantly sees herself as cute and has a quite superiority/inferiority complex, often becoming downhearted when someone else (usually Hana) is said to be cuter, and has a crush on Hinata.

A class representative in Hana's class. She aspires to be someone that everyone can rely on, but is often unreliable herself.

Another class representative in Hana's class and Koyori's best friend. She is kind and often seen as very reliable, much to Koyori's chagrin.

A girl who was in a club with Miyako during high school. While Miyako hardly remembers her, she has been obsessively fixated on her, acting like a stalker.

Miyako and Hinata's mother, who often reprimands Miyako for her shut-in behavior. She is often shown with a cigarette with nicotine filter in her mouth.

Hana's mother.

Noa's mother. The one who rubs the complex on her daughter.

Koko's younger sister. She has a pet dog named Miyako.

Media

Manga
Nanatsu Mukunoki launched the four-panel manga in Ichijinsha's Comic Yuri Hime magazine on November 18, 2016. Twelve tankōbon volumes have been released as of October 14, 2022.

Anime
An anime television series adaptation was announced in the third volume of the manga on June 15, 2018. The series is directed by Daisuke Hiramaki and written by Yuka Yamada, with animation by studio Doga Kobo and character designs by Hiromi Nakagawa. Takurō Iga is composing the series' music. The series aired on Tokyo MX and other channels between January 8 and March 26, 2019 and was simulcast by Crunchyroll. The series aired for 12 episodes. An OVA episode was bundled with the series' third Blu-ray volume on May 24, 2019, and was streamed on Crunchyroll.

Episode list

Film
A new anime project was announced on November 23, 2020. It was later announced that the project would be a new film that would premiere in theaters. The main cast and staff are reprising their roles. The film, titled , premiered on October 14, 2022.

Music
Opening Theme
Kimama na Tenshi-tachi by WATATEN☆5 (Maria Sashide, Rika Nagae, Akari Kitō, Hitomi Ōwada, Naomi Ōzora) (TV)
Precious Friends! by WATATEN☆5 (Movie)
Ending Theme
Happy Happy Friends by WATATEN☆5 (TV)
Insert Song
Tenshi no Manazashi Prologue by Rika Nagae, Akari Kitō, Hitomi Ōwada & Naomi Ōzora (Episode 12)
Watashi o Yobu Koe by Maria Sashide, Hitomi Ōwada & Naomi Ōzora (Episode 12)
Yōkoso, Tenshi no Kuni e by Hitomi Ōwada & Naomi Ōzora (Episode 12)

Reception
The anime series' first episode garnered poor reviews from Anime News Network's staff during the Winter 2019 season previews. Paul Jensen commended the production for having strong animation and delivering on some decent humor but felt wary of the script's unsavory content being given those highlights. Theron Martin saw the technical aspects as "run-of-the-mill" by Doga Kobo's standards and felt some trepidation in the premise toeing the line between innocent and creepy in its presentation, concluding that there's mild entertainment to be found but will not be for everyone. Despite finding a few laughs, Rebecca Silverman was immediately disgusted over Miyako's infatuation with Hana and the uncomfortable vibe it gives off, concluding that it will only cater to "a very specific niche audience" beyond the typical all-girl slice-of-life fanbase. Nick Creamer criticized the first half for framing Miyako's attraction like a "shoujo romance" with a predatory-like gaze but gave credit to the second half for showing Hana's viewpoint of the situation and coupling it with fluid animation, expressive character designs and snappy comedic delivery, concluding that "WATATEN! is a reasonably executed premiere, but I'll be happier if Doga Kobo gets through this "profoundly predatory romance" phase."

Gadget Tsūshin listed the first episode's title in their 2019 anime buzzwords list.

Notes

References

External links
  
 

2019 anime television series debuts
Anime series based on manga
Comedy anime and manga
Crunchyroll anime
Doga Kobo
Ichijinsha manga
Japanese LGBT-related animated television series
Yonkoma
Yuri (genre) anime and manga
Lolicon